Mid Staffordshire was a parliamentary constituency in the United Kingdom from 1983 until 1997.

It covered a swathe of territory across the centre of Staffordshire, stretching from Lichfield and Rugeley in the south to Stone in the north.

At the 1983 general election, the seat was won by John Heddle of the Conservative Party, who had previously represented the Lichfield and Tamworth constituency.  Heddle held the seat at the 1987 general election.

Following Heddle's suicide in December 1989, a by-election followed on 22 March 1990.  The by-election attracted a blaze of publicity, and a large number of candidates (14), as it took place at the height of the public dissatisfaction with the Conservative government over the Community Charge or Poll Tax (indeed, the notorious Poll Tax Riots took place only days after the by-election).  Sylvia Heal of the Labour Party was victorious in the by-election; however she failed to retain the seat at the 1992 general election, losing to the Conservatives' Michael Fabricant.

In 1997, a review by the Boundary Commission reorganised the constituencies in Staffordshire, and Mid Staffordshire was abolished.  It was replaced by parts of four constituencies: mostly by the Lichfield and Stone constituencies, apart from Rugeley which was included in Cannock Chase, and the area around the village of Great Haywood which was covered by the Stafford constituency. Michael Fabricant became MP for Lichfield at the 1997 general election.

Boundaries
The District of Lichfield wards of Armitage with Handsacre, Central, Chadsmead, Colton and Ridwares, Curborough, King's Bromley, Longdon, Leomansley, St John's, and Stowe, the Borough of Stafford wards of Barlaston, Chartley, Fulford, Haywood, Milwich, Oulton, St Michael's, and Stonefield and Christchurch, and the District of Cannock Chase wards of Brereton and Ravenhill, Brindley Heath, Etching Hill, Hagley, and Western Springs.

Members of Parliament

Elections

Elections in the 1980s

Elections in the 1990s

Notes and references

Sources
United Kingdom Election Results

Parliamentary constituencies in Staffordshire (historic)
Borough of Stafford
Politics of Lichfield
Cannock Chase District
Constituencies of the Parliament of the United Kingdom established in 1983
Constituencies of the Parliament of the United Kingdom disestablished in 1997